Henry John Brewis (8 April 1920 – 25 May 1989) was a Scottish Unionist Party politician and barrister.

Early life
Brewis was born on 8 April 1920. He was the only son and youngest child of Dorothy Katharine ( Walker) Brewis and Francis Bertie Brewis, a Lieutenant-Colonel in the King's Own Yorkshire Light Infantry.

His paternal grandparents were Frances Caroline ( Williams-Wynn) Brewis and Samuel Richard Brewis of Ibstone House, Tetsworth, and was High Sheriff of Buckinghamshire. His maternal grandparents were Edwyn Walker and Elizabeth ( Bethell) Walker.

Career
He was elected as the Member of Parliament (MP) for Galloway at a by-election in April 1959, after the death of the Unionist MP John Mackie.  He was re-elected at the general election in October 1959, and held the seat until he stood down at the October 1974 general election. He was also a Member of the European Parliament from 1973 to 1975.

He was Deputy Lieutenant of Wigtown from 24 January 1966 and Lord Lieutenant from 18 September 1981

Personal life
On 20 April 1949, he married Faith Agnes Devorguilla McTaggart-Stewart (1926–1998), a daughter of Sir Edward McTaggart-Stewart, 2nd Baronet of Southwick and Blairderry and a granddaughter of Gilbert Clifton-Hastings-Campbell, 3rd Baron Donington. Together, they were the parents of:

 Francis Roger MacTaggart Brewis (1950–2014)
 Ralph Michael Rodney Brewis (b. 1951)
 Sylvia Katharine Moira Brewis (b. 1952)
 Christopher Mark John Brewis (b. 1956)

Brewis died on 25 May 1989.

References 
Times Guide to the House of Commons February 1974

External links 
 

1920 births
1989 deaths
Scottish Conservative Party MPs
Unionist Party (Scotland) MPs
UK MPs 1955–1959
UK MPs 1959–1964
UK MPs 1964–1966
UK MPs 1966–1970
UK MPs 1970–1974
UK MPs 1974
Conservative Party (UK) MEPs
MEPs for the United Kingdom 1973–1979
Lord-Lieutenants of Wigtown
Deputy Lieutenants of Wigtownshire